The 2016 San Antonio Open was a professional tennis tournament played on outdoor hard courts. It was the 1st edition of the tournament as part of the 2016 WTA 125K series. It took place in San Antonio, United States, on 12–19 March 2016.

Singles entrants

Seeds 

 1 Rankings as of 7 March 2016.

Other entrants 
The following players received wildcards into the singles main draw:
  Irina-Camelia Begu
  Catherine Bellis
  Casey Dellacqua
  Daria Gavrilova
  Teliana Pereira
  Maria Sakkari

Withdrawals
Before the tournament 
  Karin Knapp →replaced by Lauren Davis
  Bojana Jovanovski →replaced by Naomi Broady

Doubles entrants

Seeds 

 1 Rankings as of 7 March 2016.

Other entrants 
The following pair received a wildcard into the doubles main draw:
  Ashley Weinhold /  Caitlin Whoriskey

Champions

Singles 

  Misaki Doi def.  Anna-Lena Friedsam, 6–4, 6–2

Doubles 

  Anna-Lena Grönefeld /  Nicole Melichar def.  Klaudia Jans-Ignacik /  Anastasia Rodionova, 6–1, 6–3

References

External links 
 

2016 WTA 125K series
Sanantonio
San Antonio Open